Melaka Wonderland, officially known as the Melaka Wonderland Theme Park & Resort, is a 9.2-hectares wide water theme park and resort in Ayer Keroh, Malacca, Malaysia which features 16 attractions. It was officiated by Malacca Chief Minister Mohd Ali Rustam on 15 May 2010.

See also
 List of tourist attractions in Malacca
 List of water parks

References

External links
 

2010 establishments in Malaysia
Amusement parks in Melaka
Amusement parks opened in 2010
Ayer Keroh
Water parks in Malaysia